Seducing Doctor Lewis (French: La grande séduction) is a 2003 Quebec comedy film and the first film directed by Jean-François Pouliot. The script was written by Ken Scott. It won the Audience Award at 2004 Sundance Film Festival. Starring in the movie are Raymond Bouchard, Benoît Brière, David Boutin and Lucie Laurier.

Plot
The small fishing village Ste-Marie-la-Mauderne on the north coast of Quebec is in decline. Every resident collects welfare. To lure a company into building a plastic container factory nearby, they need to double their population of 120, have a resident doctor, and give a $50,000 bribe for the company owner.

Montreal plastic surgeon Dr. Christopher Lewis (David Boutin) gets pulled over for speeding by an officer, Réal Fournier (Jean-Pierre Gonthier), the former mayor of Ste-Marie-la-Mauderne who moved to the city because he, like most of the residents of Ste-Marie, couldn't get a job there. After finding cocaine on Dr. Lewis, Fournier agrees not arrest him for drug possession if Dr. Lewis will visit Ste-Marie-la-Mauderne for one month. In a deleted scene, Dr. Lewis sells cocaine to his patients.

Germain Lesage (Raymond Bouchard), a welfare recipient himself and the new mayor, hatches a plan. The entire village will convince Dr. Lewis to stay. They tap his phone, and pretend to share his likes: cricket, fusion jazz, and all the same foods. Henri Giroux (Benoît Brière), the local banker whose sole job is to cash the townfolks' welfare cheques, leaves small amounts of money for Dr. Lewis to find as small measures to increase Dr. Lewis' happiness about being in town, and attempts to secure a loan through his bank for the bribe. Dr. Lewis likes the beautiful post office worker Ève Beauchemin (Lucie Laurier), but Ève knows he has a girlfriend, Brigitte, in Montreal.

The ruse works, but they cannot secure a loan. Henri fronts the money from his personal savings, after a bank executive tells him that he has a job only as a favour to his father, and that his position could easily be replaced by an ATM. When the plastics company owner arrives, everyone continues their elaborate trick, and convinces him to build the factory there. The owner is ready to sign, but insists that they must have a doctor.

When Dr. Lewis learns that Brigitte has been having an affair with his best friend Paul for three years, he proclaims that he will stay because everyone in the village is genuine. Germain feels bad for lying, and "lets him off the hook" by telling him another lie in that they have secured another person as a permanent doctor. Hurt, Dr. Lewis turns to Ève, who has disliked all the lying, and confesses all to him, including the phone tap. Dr. Lewis confronts Germain about the lies, with Germain confirming the accusations. When Dr. Lewis asks him if he will learn the game of cricket for real if he decides to stay, Germain replies "no". It is then that Dr. Lewis decides to stay. The factory is built, Ste-Marie-la-Mauderne is saved, everyone gains renewed pride, and Dr. Lewis has five years in which to woo Ève.

Production
Producer Roger Frappier wanted to film Seducing Doctor Lewis in Newfoundland but the film was eventually shot on an island with a population of about 300, Harrington Harbour, Quebec, Canada. The film's producers felt the island looked too pretty to fill the role of a fishing village experiencing hard times, so they worsened its appearance in the movie.

Awards
Winner - Sundance Film Festival: World Cinema Audience Award Genie Award – Cinematography; Prix Jutra – Supporting Actor (Pierre Collin), Supporting Actress (Desrochers), Editing, Cinematography, Art Director, Sound and Costumes.

Remakes

An English language remake titled The Grand Seduction was released in 2013, starring Taylor Kitsch as Dr Lewis with Brendan Gleeson, Mary Walsh, Cathy Jones, and Gordon Pinsent as town folks. The story's setting was moved to Newfoundland.

A French remake Un village presque parfait (English: An almost perfect village) produced by Stéphane Meunier, was released in 2015. The action takes place in a small imaginary Pyrenean village : Saint-Loin-la-Mauderne, which is twinned with Sainte-Marie-la-Mauderne from the original movie.

References

External links

2003 films
Canadian comedy films
Sundance Film Festival award winners
Films directed by Jean-François Pouliot
Films set in Quebec
Films shot in Quebec
French-language Canadian films
2000s Canadian films